The 2021 The Spring League season is the sixth and final season of The Spring League. This is the only season to feature eight teams in two divisions: the North Division in Indianapolis, Indiana and the South Division in Houston, Texas.

The Linemen beat the Jousters 26–23 in the first and only Mega Bowl, and won the TSL championship. Linemen QB Ryan Willis won both final and regular season MVP awards.

Format and rules
The 2021 season kicked off on Thursday, May 6 and was divided to two divisions that played in hub cities: The North Division in Indianapolis and the South Division in Houston. Each division champion will advance to the 2021 TSL Championship game that will take place on June 19.

The 2021 season featured new rules that aim to improve the game, specifically introducing a new overtime format, the “spot and choose” rule, which means that the team that wins the overtime coin toss was to pick the spot of the ball, while the other team would choose whether to play offense or defense. A similar rule was proposed by the Baltimore Ravens after the 2020 NFL season.

Players
The player participation fee for the 2021 season was $2,000, with exception for players who had been in an NFL training camp within the past three years, who were not required to pay. According to league CEO Brian Woods, the preference was for TSL coaches, players and staff to be vaccinated for COVID-19 before the season begins. If not, they were asked for proof of a negative test upon arrival and were subject to daily testing thereafter.

Every team started the season with 35 to 41 players roster, and were allowed to make changes throughout the season.

Tryouts
In March 2021, TSL announced that they reached a partnership agreement with Stephen Austin's American National Combines, and were holding tryouts for the first time in league history. They also declared that players who were on an active roster during TSL's fall 2020 season are not required to participate in the tryouts.

Notable players
On April 16, the first player for the 2021 TSL season was announced, as former Syracuse and Dallas Renegades QB Eric Dungey confirmed he will play for the Blues, although he was later accepted tryout invite to Cincinnati Bengals rookie minicamp, and was later signed to their 90-men roster. On later date the league revealed the other Quarterbacks who will play, including seven-year NFL veteran Ryan Mallett (Generals), former XFL players Luis Perez (Jousters), Brandon Silvers (Conquerors), and Nick Fitzgerald (Sea Lions), and three former P5 colleges QB's Brian Lewerke (Alphas), Keller Chryst (Aviators), and Ryan Willis (Linemen).

On May 12, after the first week was concluded, TSL announced that former Super Bowl champion Brandon Marshall was joining the Generals after strong showing at HUB Football camp, but before the Generals game on week 2 it was revealed that Marshall decided to pursue NFL opportunities instead of joining the league.

39 players with XFL experience were on TSL rosters, and 19 players who participated in the Fan Controlled Football 2021 season (Joseph Putu, Roman Tatum, David Gilbert, Kwadarrius Smith, Curtis Collins, Dominique Martin, Jaylen Flye-Sadler, EJ price, JaMichael Edwards Lott, Deondre Francois, Lawerence Keys, Dwayne Wallace, Donald Boone, Ladarius Galloway, Andrew Jamiel, KaVontae Turpin, Saige Young, Cecil Cherry and Antonio Dawkins).

The league also featured three international players: Kicker Tadhg Leader (Aviators) from the Republic of Ireland, Defensive Linemen Orlovicius Laurynas (Blues) from Lithuania and Wide receiver James Tyrrell from Canada.

Other noteworthy players
  
Alphas: Vad Lee, Brian Lewerke, Jawill Davis, Kristjan Sokoli, Christian DiLauro, Gabe Holmes, Azeem Victor and Mazzi Wilkins, while Brady White joined before week 4.

Aviators: Keller Chryst, Romar Morris, Malcolm Pridgeon, Lavon Hooks, Mark McLaurin and Irish-born American rugby union player Tadhg Leader, while Vad Lee joined from the "Alphas" before week 5.

Blues: Eric Dungey, Deondre Francois, Fabian Guerra, Davion Davis, Hakeem Valles, David Grinnage, Denzel Rice and Xavier Perston.

Conquerors: Brandon Silvers, Kevin Anderson, Cameron Jefferson, Anthony Morris, Robenson Therezie, Matt Seybert, Prince Charles Iworah and Vinny Papale (son of Vince Papale), while Ahmad Gooden joined before week 2.

Generals: Ryan Mallett, Case Cookus, Devin Gray, Jordan Suell, Sal Cannella, Ethan Westbrooks, Blair Brown, Carroll Phillips, Kamilo Tongamoa, Nevelle Clarke, Malik Gant and Lirim Hajrullahu.

Jousters: Luis Perez, Drew Anderson, Lavon Coleman, De'Lance Turner, De’Quan Hampton, Damore'ea Stringfellow, Donnie Ernsberger, Tejan Koroma, Damien Mama, Bunmi Rotimi, Tomasi Laulile, Christian Sam, Nyles Morgan, Derrick Jones, A. J. Hendy, Shalom Luani, Joshua Simmons, William Likely, Ricky Aguayo, Manoa Pikula and Colton Schmidt.

Linemen: Ryan Willis, Reece Horn, Frederick Mauigoa, Elijah Qualls and Jordan Wyatt, while Damon Sheehy-Guiseppi joined before week 6.

Sea Lions: Nick Fitzgerald, Matt Jones (released after week 1), Adam Choice, Kendrick Rogers, Nick Buchanan, Shaneil Jenkins, Levonta Taylor, John Baron II and DeAndre Johnson from Last Chance U' second season, while Jordan Mills and Robert Myers joined before week 2, and Garrett Hartley joined before week 4.

Coaches
For the 2021 spring season TSL featured a mix of returning coaches from previous seasons and former college football college or minor leagues HC's. Terry Shea (Aviators), Ted Cottrell (Blues), Jerry Glanville (Conquerors) and defending champion Bart Andrus (Generals) returned to their 2020 Fall season teams, while Peter Vaas (Alphas) and Kevin Gilbride (Jousters) replaced Steve Fairchild and Chuck Bresnahan (respectively). Hal Mumme was appointed as the "Linemen" head coach, while Mike Riley was first announced as the "Sea Lions" coach, but it was later changed to Larry Kirksey. Shea is the only one that coached in every TSL season.

Some of the more recognizable assistants were Paul Spicer (DC, Sea Lions), AJ Smith (OC, Conquerors), Derrius Bell (DC, Blues), Jay Hayes (DC, Jousters), Jeff Reinebold (DC/STC, Generals), Dale Carlson (WR, Linemen), Blake Brockermeyer (OL, Sea Lions) and Johnnie Mack (RB, Blues), while QB Stan Bedwell was a player-coach for the Linemen.

Teams
The 2021 season featured two new teams: The Linemen and Sea Lions, which were added to the six returning teams from the 2020 fall season. 

{{small| Week 6 games were played at the Bud and Jackie Sellick Bowl.}}

Games
The games will be played on Thursdays, Fridays and Saturdays, and for the first time, one game every week will be broadcast on FOX (including the championship game), while all other games will be broadcast on FS1 and FS2. OvertimeStandings

Awards

Players of the week

 Statistical leaders 
Records reflect statistics through regular season games only.

Signees to professional leagues
The following players signed with NFL or CFL teams following their involvement with The Spring League in 2021:

NFL''

CFL

Controversy
In November the league was sued for failing to pay $1.4 million in bills during a nine-week stay in Indianapolis, for the use of Lucas Oil Stadium ($235,000 for six games) and hotel stay ($1.1 million for 4,740 room nights). Also, Butler University sued TSL for about $33,000 in unpaid bills, for its use of the Sellick Bowl for practices.

Aftermath
On June 3, 2021, Woods announced that he had acquired the remaining extant trademarks of the United States Football League with intent of launching a USFL-branded league in 2022, with Fox Sports remaining as a partner in the new USFL. What was to become of The Spring League remained, at the time, an unresolved question, but according to the initial announcement TSL was to continue, probably as a scouting showcase or developmental operation. It was later reported that TSL in no longer associated with the new USFL.

However, on February 18, 2022, Woods stated that TSL was "no longer operational."

References

The Spring League